The Akawaio are an indigenous people who live in Roraima (Brazil), Guyana, and Venezuela. They are one of several closely related peoples called Ingarikó and Kapon. Akawaio language used by 5,000 to 6,000 speakers.

History 
Akawaio were known as prominent traders in the region. At the time of European contact, Akawaio lived on Guyana's coastal belt, moving inland as lands were taken for use as plantations. Akawaios, as well as Caribs, were used to capture other Amerindians as slaves as well as hunt down runaway slaves that has been brought from Africa.

In Guyana, Akawaio settlements are concentrated around the upper Mazaruni, Barama, upper Pomeroon, Demerara, Wenamu, and upper Cuyuni rivers.

Culture

Religion 
Akawaios have polytheistic beliefs. Mythological figures like Makunaima, Kanaima, Iwarrika and Sigu are an important part of their culture. The most important god is Makunaima because, in their opinion, he created the tribe. Furthermore, they associate some natural phenomena to some divinities like Iwarrika who is blamed for flooding the earth. The Shaman plays an important part in their religious practice. He meets the god during hallucinogenic rituals when tobacco and a specific diet are used.

Food 
To be self-sufficient, the Akawaio people grow banana, yams, raw cane sugar, taro, cotton, calabash... However, they do not exclusively feed on plants, they also hunt deer, peccary, tapirs, agoutis or pacas. For hunting, they traditionally use blowpipes or bows and arrows but nowadays they also use guns. They make a lot of different alcoholic and non-alcoholic drinks.

Economic activities 
Work in the Akawaio community is gender-based. Women work in weaving, pottery and house keeping. Meanwhile, men tend to devote to hunting or peddling. Akawaios trade quivers or other productions for clothes, fruits and weapons.

The tribe of Akawaio has a particular educational model based on non-violence and respect. Akawaio focus on dialogue and separating rivals during disagreements. Sharing is a central value. Indeed, in the village, no one  has more property than the other members of the community.

References

Ethnic groups in Brazil
Indigenous peoples in Brazil
Indigenous peoples in Venezuela
Indigenous peoples in Guyana
Indigenous peoples of the Guianas